Tereza Mihalíková (born 2 June 1998) is a Slovak tennis player. She has a career-high singles ranking of 349 by the Women's Tennis Association (WTA), achieved June 2018, and a career-high WTA doubles ranking of 48, attained on 7 November 2022. While still playing mostly at tournaments of the ITF Women's Circuit in singles, she had her breakthrough in doubles, after winning her first WTA Tour title in 2021 and debuting in the top 100 rankings. She has won only one WTA doubles title and three WTA Challenger Tour doubles titles but eight singles and 19 doubles titles on the ITF Circuit.

Mihalíková was very successful as a junior. As a former junior No. 4, she won the Australian Open in both events. First, in 2015, she won the girls' singles event, after defeating Katie Swan in the final. Her doubles title came a year later, when, alongside Anna Kalinskaya, she defeated Dayana Yastremska and Anastasia Zarycká. She is also three time Grand Slam finalist in doubles: 2014 US Open and Australian Open and Wimbledon in 2015.

Junior career

Junior Grand Slam performance
Singles:
 Australian Open: W (2015) 
 French Open: 2R (2014)
 Wimbledon: 3R (2015)
 US Open: 2R (2014)

Doubles:
 Australian Open: W (2016)
 French Open: 2R (2014)
 Wimbledon: F (2015)
 US Open: F (2014)

Highlights 
In 2014, Mihalíková reached the final of the girls' doubles tournament at the US Open, partnering with Vera Lapko.

She was also a member of the Slovak Junior Fed Cup team (U16). Together with Viktória Kužmová and Tamara Kupková, she reached the final in 2014, when they lost to the United States team (CiCi Bellis, Tornado Alicia Black, Sofia Kenin).

Mihalíková entered doubles competition at the 2015 Australian Open, again alongside Lapko. They lost their quarterfinal match to the eventual champions, Miriam Kolodziejová and Markéta Vondroušová. But she won the singles competition, defeating British Katie Swan in the final. At the 2016 Australian Open, Mihalíková won the girls' doubles event with Anna Kalinskaya and ended runner-up in the girls' singles event, losing the final to Vera Lapko.

Professional career

2021: Progress in doubles; first WTA Tour title and top 100 debut
Mihalíková made a progress in her doubles career after making some good results during the season of 2021. In early season, she get to the title at the $25K Hamburg tournament, partnering with Anna Bondár. Two months later, they advanced to the another final but this time finished as a runner-up at the $25K event in Manacor. In June, her progress continued with her first WTA Challenger Tour final at the Bol Ladies Open. Together with Ekaterine Gorgodze, she lost to the pair of Aliona Bolsova and Katarzyna Kawa. The following month, she reached another Challenger final, at the Swedish Open alongside Kamilla Rakhimova. Just like the previous final, she lost in three sets.

Things got even better in September, when she reached her first WTA Tour tournament doubles final. Partnering with Anna Kalinskaya, she defeated Aleksandra Krunić/Lesley Pattinama Kerkhove, in three sets. In October, she won two ITF $60k tournaments; the first one at the Henderson Open in Las Vegas, followed up with the title at the Rancho Santa Fe Open. In the first half of December, she was successful in her third attempt in a WTA Challenger final. She won the title at the Open Angers alongside Greet Minnen, after beating former Grand Slam tournament doubles champion, Vera Zvonareva, and former Grand Slam doubles finalist, Monica Niculescu. These results pushed her in December into the top 100 for the first time.

Performance timeline

Singles

Doubles
Current after the 2023 Qatar Open.

WTA career finals

Doubles: 2 (1 title, 1 runner-up)

WTA Challenger finals

Doubles: 5 (3 titles, 2 runner-ups)

ITF Circuit finals

Singles: 12 (8 titles, 4 runner-ups)

Doubles: 35 (19 titles, 16 runner–ups)

Junior finals

Junior Grand Slam tournaments

Girls' singles: 2 (1 title, 1 runner–up)

Girls' doubles: 3 (1 title, 2 runner–ups)

ITF Junior Circuit finals

Singles: 7 (4 titles, 3 runner–ups)

Doubles: 17 (9 titles, 8 runner–ups)

Fed Cup/Billie Jean King Cup

Doubles (1–3)

Notes

References

External links
 
 
 

1998 births
Living people
Sportspeople from Topoľčany
Slovak female tennis players
Australian Open (tennis) junior champions
Grand Slam (tennis) champions in girls' singles
Grand Slam (tennis) champions in girls' doubles
21st-century Slovak women